The Polousny Range is a mountain range in the Sakha Republic, Far Eastern Federal District, Russia.

This range is one of the areas of Yakutia where kigilyakhs are found.

History
The area of the Polousny Range was first mapped by geographer and ethnologist Baron Gerhard von Maydell (1835–1894) during his pioneering research of East Siberia.

The Chondon mammoth was discovered in 2013, at the feet of the Polousny Range in the Chondon basin, 66 km south-west of the village of Tumat.

Geography
The Polousny Range is part of the Momsko-Chersk Mountain Region. It rises in the southern area of the Yana-Indigirka Lowland, north of the Aby Lowland in the Sakha region. It is made up of mountains of middle height and smooth slopes. It includes separate low mountain ranges with stretches of plain in between roughly aligned from east to west. 

In the east, the Ulakhan-Sis, a prolongation of the range on the other side of the Indigirka River, stretches eastwards. To the west rises the Kyun-Tas and southwest of it the Selennyakh Range. Lakes Ozhogino and Suturuokha are located by the southern slopes of the eastern end of the range. The sources of the Allaikha and the Byoryolyokh, two important tributaries of the Indigirka, are located north of the range.

The lower slopes of the mountains have larch forests and forest tundra vegetation, while the higher altitudes are covered by mountain tundra.

Geology
In the context of the singularity of the geology of the Polousny Range, Russian geomorphologist M. Groswald commented:

References

External links
Mineralogy, Petro-, and Geochemistry of the Composite Dikes of the Takalkan Ore-Magmatic Cluster (Polousny Synclinorium of the Verkhoyansk-Kolyma Orogenic Area)

Mountain ranges of the Sakha Republic